The 2016–17 Wake Forest Demon Deacons men's basketball team represented Wake Forest University during the 2016–17 NCAA Division I men's basketball season. The Demon Deacons were led by third-year head coach Danny Manning. The team played their home games at the Lawrence Joel Veterans Memorial Coliseum in Winston-Salem, North Carolina as a member of the Atlantic Coast Conference. They finished the season 19–14, 9–9 in ACC play to finish in tenth place. They defeated Boston College in the first round of the ACC tournament to advance to the second round where they lost to Virginia Tech. They received an at-large bid to the NCAA tournament as a No. 11 seed in the South region. There they lost in the First Four to Kansas State.

Previous season
The Demon Deacons finished 2015–16 season 11–20, 2–16 in ACC play to finish in 14th place. They lost to NC State in the first round of the ACC tournament.

Offseason

Departures

Incoming transfers

2016 recruiting class

2017 recruiting class

Roster

Schedule and results

|-
!colspan=9 style=| Exhibition

|-
!colspan=9 style=| Non-conference regular season

|-
!colspan=12 style=| ACC regular season

|-
!colspan=9 style=| ACC tournament

|-
!colspan=9 style=| NCAA tournament

References

Wake Forest Demon Deacons men's basketball seasons
Wake Forest
Wake Forest